Moral Re-Armament (MRA) was an international moral and spiritual movement that, in 1938, developed from American minister Frank Buchman's Oxford Group. Buchman headed MRA for 23 years until his death in 1961. In 2001, the movement was renamed Initiatives of Change.

History

Beginning
In 1938, Europe was rearming militarily.  Frank Buchman, who had been the driving force behind the Oxford Group, was convinced that military rearmament alone would not resolve the crisis.  At a meeting of 3,000 in East Ham Town Hall, London, on 29 May 1938, he launched a campaign for Moral Re-Armament.  "The crisis is fundamentally a moral one," he said. "The nations must re-arm morally. Moral recovery is essentially the forerunner of economic recovery. Moral recovery creates not crisis but confidence and unity in every phase of life."

The phrase caught the mood of the time, and many public figures in Britain spoke and wrote in support.  British tennis star H. W. Austin edited the book Moral Rearmament (The Battle for Peace), which sold half a million copies.

There was a similar response in the United States.  The Mayor of New York City declared 7–14 May to be "MRA week', and 14,000 people came to Madison Square Garden on 14 May for the public launch.  Three weeks later Constitution Hall in Washington, D.C. was the site of another launch, to which 240 British Members of Parliament sent a message of support.  And on 19 July 1939, 30,000 people attended the launch of Moral Re-Armament in the Hollywood Bowl, Los Angeles.

Wartime
Moral Re-Armament also became established in many countries of continental Europe, but it was suppressed in all the countries occupied by Nazi Germany.  In Norway and elsewhere MRA leaders were imprisoned.  In 1945, during the Allied invasion of Europe a 126-page Gestapo report on Buchman, the Oxford Group and Moral Re-Armament was discovered. Die Oxfordgruppenbewegung denounces Dr Buchman and Moral Re-Armament for "uncompromisingly taking up a frontal position against National Socialism… It preaches revolution against the National State, and has quite evidently become its Christian opponent."

In 1940, the novelist Daphne du Maurier published Come Wind, Come Weather, stories of ordinary Britons who had found hope and new life through MRA.  She dedicated it to "Frank Buchman, whose initial vision made possible the world of the living characters in these stories," and added, "What they are doing up and down the country in helping men and women solve their problems, and prepare them for whatever lies ahead, will prove to be of national importance in the days to come."  The book sold 650,000 copies in Britain alone.

When war broke out, many of those active in the campaign for Moral Re-Armament joined the Allied forces. Others worked to heighten morale and overcome bottlenecks, particularly in war-related industries.  Senator (later President) Harry Truman, Chair of the Senate's Truman Committee investigating war contracts, told a Washington press conference in 1943: "Suspicions, rivalries, apathy, greed lie behind most of the bottlenecks.  This is where the Moral Re-Armament group comes in.  Where others have stood back and criticised, they have rolled up their sleeves and gone to work.  They have already achieved remarkable results in bringing teamwork into industry, on the principles not of 'who's right' but of 'what's right'."

In Britain, about 30 MRA workers were exempted from military service to continue this work.  When Ernest Bevin became Minister of Labour in 1940, he decided to conscript them.  Over 2,500 clergy and ministers signed a petition opposing this, and 174 Members of Parliament put down a motion stating the same.  Bevin made clear that he would resign from the Government if he was defeated, and the Government put a three-line whip upon its supporters.  As a result, the Oxford Group workers were excluded from the Exemption from Military Service bill.

After the war
At the end of the war, the MRA workers returned to the task of establishing a lasting peace.  In 1946, 50 Swiss families active in the work of MRA bought and restored a large, derelict hotel at Caux, Switzerland.  This became a centre of European reconciliation, attended by thousands in the following years, including German Chancellor Konrad Adenauer and French Foreign Minister Robert Schuman.  Buchman was awarded the Croix de Chevalier of the Légion d'honneur by the French Government, and also the German Grand Cross of the Order of Merit.  The historians Douglas Johnston and Cynthia Sampson described the work as an "important contribution to one of the greatest achievements in the entire record of modern statecraft: the astonishingly rapid Franco-German reconciliation after 1945."

In Britain, hundreds donated money for the purchase of the Westminster Theatre in London, as a living memorial to the men and women of Moral Re-Armament who had died in war service.  Many servicemen gave their gratuities.  For the next 50 years the theatre presented a host of plays and musicals.  One of the best-known was the pantomime Give a Dog a Bone, which ran every Christmas for many years, to the delight of thousands of children.

In France, the well-known philosopher Gabriel Marcel edited a book, Un Changement d'Espérance à la Rencontre du Réarmament Moral, which brings together the stories of a French socialist leader, a Brazilian docker, an African chief, a Buddhist abbot, a Canadian industrialist and many others who found a new approach through MRA.  The English edition, published by Longman, was titled Fresh Hope for the World.

MRA began holding conferences on Mackinac Island, Michigan, in 1942, first at The Island House (rented for $1). They then purchased abandoned Mission House hotel and adjacent property on the island's east end. Between 1954 and 1960 they constructed an extensive training center there including a theatre and a soundstage.  The soundstage was used for the production of motion pictures, including The Crowning Experience, Voice of the Hurricane, and Decision at Midnight.

In 1966, MRA deeded much of the property on the island to Mackinac College.  Several new facilities, including a classroom building and a library were constructed.  This independent and non-sectarian institution of higher education operated from 1966 until 1970.  It developed programs in statesmanship and leadership, as well as more traditional curricula.

Global spread
In the 1950s and 1960s, MRA's work expanded across the globe.  Buchman was a pioneer in multi-faith initiatives.  As he said, "MRA is the good road of an ideology inspired by God upon which all can unite. Catholic, Jew and Protestant, Hindu, Muslim, Buddhist and Confucianist – all find they can change, where needed, and they can travel along this good road together.".

These ideas appealed to many in the African and Asian countries which were then moving towards independence from colonial rule.  Leaders of these independence struggles have paid tribute to MRA for helping to bring about unity between groups in conflict, and for helping to ease the transition to independence. In 1956 King Mohammed V of Morocco sent a message to Buchman: "I thank you for all you have done for Morocco in the course of these last testing years. Moral Re-Armament must become for us Muslims as much an incentive as it is for you Christians and for all nations." In 1953, Kim Beazley Sr. the future Minister for Education in Australia, joined the movement following a visit to Switzerland. For him, "the need to uphold truth and reconciliation, and abjure expediency and acrimony, became ever more imperative. In 1960 Archbishop Makarios and Dr Kucuk, President and Vice-President of Cyprus, jointly sent the first flag of independent Cyprus to Frank Buchman at Caux in recognition of MRA's help.

In Japan several conservative leaders of the 1950s were active in the movement, allowing them to make contact with likeminded leaders in Europe and the US. Yasuhiro Nakasone, Ichiro Hatoyama, and Nobusuke Kishi, were all involved in the movement.

Criticism
MRA was regularly attacked in the 1950s by the Radio Moscow Overseas Service.  In November 1952 it said, "Moral Re-Armament supplants the inevitable class war by the 'permanent struggle between good and evil'," and "has the power to attract radical revolutionary minds."

The Catholic theologian John Hardon claimed that the movement's political ideas were naïve, since they appeared to assume that moral awakening would solve "social problems that have vexed humanity since the dawn of history". Other Catholics took a different view. In 1993 Cardinal Franz Koenig, Archbishop of Vienna, wrote that "Buchman was a turning-point in the history of the modern world through his ideas."

The actress Glenn Close, whose parents were part of the movement, has described it as a cult.

Influence
MRA has always been active in industry and business.  In Buchman's view, management and labour could "work together like the fingers on the hand", and in order to make that possible he aimed to answer "the self-will in management and labour who are both so right, and so wrong".  MRA's role was to offer the experience which would free those people's hearts and minds from the motivations or prejudices which prevent just solutions.

William Grogan, an International Vice-President of the Transport Workers Union of America, said that "between 1946 and 1953 national union leaders, local union officials, shop stewards and rank and file union members from 75 countries had received training" in MRA principles.  Evert Kupers, for 20 years president of the Dutch Confederation of Trades Unions, stated that "the thousands who have visited Caux have been deeply impressed by its message for our age and by the real comradeship they found there".  In France Maurice Mercier, secretary-general of the textile workers within the Force Ouvriere, said: "Class war today means one half of humanity against the other half, each possessing a powerful arsenal of destruction... Not one cry of hatred, not one hour of work lost, not one drop of blood shed - that is the revolution to which MRA calls bosses and workers."

Beliefs
The movement had Christian roots, but it grew into an informal, international network of people of all faiths and backgrounds.  It advocated what it called the 'Four Absolutes' (absolute honesty, absolute purity, absolute unselfishness and absolute love) and it encouraged its members to be actively involved in political and social issues.  One of the movement's core ideas was the belief that changing the world starts with seeking change in oneself.

Renamed "Initiatives of Change"

In 2001, the MRA movement changed its name to Initiatives of Change (IofC). A non-governmental organization based in Caux, Switzerland, Initiatives of Change International serves as the legal and administrative entity to federate the national bodies of Initiatives of Change for purposes of cooperation with the entities such as the United Nations and the Council of Europe.

National initiatives include Hope in the Cities in the United States, the Caux Forum for Human Security in Switzerland, Global Indigenous Dialogue in Canada and the IC Centre for Governance in India.

In the media
In 2014, Initiatives of Change was awarded the Ousseimi Prize for Tolerance.  The Ousseimi Foundation produced a booklet outlining the work of Moral Re-Armament and Initiatives of Change in peace-building and change-making since 1946.

The group is also mentioned in Raymond Chandler's book Farewell, My Lovely. A cop says to Philip Marlowe: "I think we gotta make this little world all over again. Now take Moral Rearmament. There you've got something. M. R. A. There you've got something, baby."

See also
 Up with People
 Michael Henderson (author)

References

 Preliminary Guide to the Albert Heman Ely, Jr. Family Papers, Manuscripts and Archives, Yale University Library, Materials document the 1930 meeting of Ely and his wife, Constance Jennings Ely with Frank Buchman, and their subsequent involvement in the Moral Re-armament movement, Yale Library.

Further reading
 Hofmann, Reto "The Conservative Imaginary: Moral Re-armament and the Internationalism of the Japanese Right, 1945–1962," Japan Forum, (1991) 33:1, 77-102, DOI:10.1080/09555803.2019.1646785
 Lean, Garth. Frank Buchman - a life (Constable 1985) online

External links
 Initiatives of Change, successor of MRA
 Timeline of the organizations' history, Initiatives of Change

Religious organizations established in 1938
1938 establishments in England